Donald Charles "Don" Leach (born 5 November 1980) is a New Zealand rower. He is a renowned bush pilot specialising in riverbed landings up the Rangitata River in the central South Island.

Leach was born in Christchurch. He represented New Zealand in the coxless four at the 2004 Summer Olympics at Athens, where the team came fifth.

References 

 Black Gold by Ron Palenski (2008, 2004 New Zealand Sports Hall of Fame, Dunedin) p. 57

External links 
 
 
 

1980 births
Living people
New Zealand male rowers
Olympic rowers of New Zealand
Rowers at the 2004 Summer Olympics